Teck Ghee Single Member Constituency was a single member constituency (SMC) in Ang Mo Kio, Singapore. The constituency was formed in 1984 and was abolished in 1991

History 
In 1984, the Teck Ghee Constituency was formed by merging parts of Ang Mo Kio and Chong Boon constituencies. Lee Hsien Loong made his political debut in this constituency when it was formed.

In 1988, it was renamed as Teck Ghee Single Member Constituency as part of Singapore's political reforms. In 1991, it was abolished and merged into Ang Mo Kio Group Representation Constituency.

Member of Parliament

Elections

Elections in 1980s

References
1988 General Election's result
1984 General Election's result

Singaporean electoral divisions
Ang Mo Kio